David Emmanuel is the name of:

 David Emmanuel (mathematician) (1854–1941), Romanian mathematician
 David Emmanuel (musician), Grenadian musician
 Smiley Culture (1963–2011), born David Victor Emmanuel, British musician

See also
 David Emanuel (disambiguation)